Ole Jacob Pedersen (April 22, 1889 – March 27, 1961) was a Norwegian track and field athlete who competed in the 1912 Summer Olympics. In 1912 he was eliminated in the semi-finals of the 400 metres competition. In the 800 metres event as well as in the 1500 metres competition he was eliminated in the first round.

References

External links
list of Norwegian athletes 

1889 births
1961 deaths
Norwegian male sprinters
Norwegian male middle-distance runners
Olympic athletes of Norway
Athletes (track and field) at the 1912 Summer Olympics